"Lucky Me" is a song written by Charlie Black and Rory Bourke, and recorded by Canadian country music artist Anne Murray.  It was released in March 1980 as the first single from her album Somebody's Waiting.  The song reached number 1 on the RPM Adult Contemporary Tracks chart in May 1980.

Chart performance

References

Songs about luck
1980 singles
Anne Murray songs
Capitol Records singles
Songs written by Rory Bourke
Song recordings produced by Jim Ed Norman
Songs written by Charlie Black
1980 songs